Hapgood State Forest covers   in Peru, Vermont in Bennington County. The forest is managed by the Vermont Department of Forests, Parks, and Recreation and surrounds the summit of 3,260-foot Bromley Mountain.

Much of this State Forest is leased to Bromley, Inc. to be operated as a ski area.

References

External links
Official website

Vermont state forests
Protected areas of Bennington County, Vermont
Peru, Vermont